Aurel Ștefan (born 7 January 1950) is a Romanian fencer. He competed in the team foil event at the 1972 Summer Olympics.

References

1950 births
Living people
Romanian male fencers
Romanian foil fencers
Olympic fencers of Romania
Fencers at the 1972 Summer Olympics
Sportspeople from Bucharest